is the third album by solo singer and former Morning Musume and Petit Moni member Maki Goto.

This album was released on February 23, 2005 and features several songs with different versions from the originals. "Watarasebashi" is a cover version of Chisato Moritaka's song, also covered by fellow Hello! Project member Aya Matsuura and the "Goto Version" of "Renai Sentai Shitsu Ranger" is Goto's solo version of the original Nochiura Natsumi song. The first press edition comes in a special package with three photo cards, also it includes an alternate cover.

Track listing

External links 
 3rd Station entry on the Up-Front Works official website
 Maki Goto lyrics at Projecthello.com

2005 albums
Maki Goto albums
Piccolo Town albums